The 2020–21 Boston College Eagles men's basketball team represented Boston College during the 2020–21 NCAA Division I men's basketball season. The Eagles, were led by seventh-year head coach Jim Christian, played their home games at the Conte Forum as members of the Atlantic Coast Conference. Christian was fired on February 15, 2021, after starting the season 3–13. Assistant Coach Scott Spinelli served as the interim head coach to finish the season. In a season limited due to the ongoing COVID-19 pandemic, the Eagles finished the season 4–16, 2–11 in ACC play to finish in last place. They lost to Duke in the first round of the ACC tournament.

On March 15, the school named College of Charleston head coach Earl Grant the new coach for the Eagles.

Previous season
The Eagles finished the 2019–20 season finished the season 13–19, 7–13 in ACC play to finish in a tie for 10th place. They lost to Notre Dame in the second round of the ACC tournament. The tournament and all other postseason tournaments were thereafter canceled due to the COVID-19 pandemic.

Offseason

Departures

Incoming transfers

2020 recruiting class

Roster

Schedule and results

Source:

|-
!colspan=9 style=| Regular season

|-
!colspan=12 style=|ACC tournament

Rankings

*AP does not release post-NCAA tournament rankings^Coaches did not release a Week 2 poll.

References

Boston College Eagles men's basketball seasons
Boston College
Boston College Eagles men's basketball
Boston College Eagles men's basketball
Boston College Eagles men's basketball
Boston College Eagles men's basketball